Lucky Peak Dam is a rolled earth and gravel fill embankment dam in the western United States, located on the Boise River in southwestern Idaho. In Ada County east of Boise, it is directly downstream of Arrowrock Dam, a concrete arch dam completed in 1915.

Construction began in November 1949 by the U.S. Army Corps of Engineers; many men were lost blasting the mountain. Most had no experience with dynamite. They brought in Clifford Riddle who was an expert in dynamite. Clifford had settled his wife and sons in the Boise Valley. Clifford carved the crucial operational curve of the road to reach the reservoir called Lucky Peak Lake.

Most of the federal dams in southern Idaho, including the others on the Boise River, were built by the Bureau of Reclamation, not the Corps of Engineers. The Idaho Power Company, a private utility, built multiple hydroelectric dams on the 

Construction of the powerhouse began in 1984 and it became operational in 1988, generating electricity primarily for 

The summit elevation of Lucky Peak mountain (a.k.a.

The dam forms Lucky Peak Lake and is surrounded by Lucky Peak State Park.

The dam is also in close proximity to the Lucky Peak Dam Zeolite Occurrence.

Gallery

References

External links

U.S. Army Corps of Engineers - Lucky Peak Dam & Lake
U.S. Bureau of Reclamation - Idaho facilities
Seattle City Light - a brief history
Bureau of Reclamation - major storage reservoirs in the Boise & Payette River basins - current levels & flows

Dams in Idaho
Hydroelectric power plants in Idaho
Buildings and structures in Ada County, Idaho
Rock-filled dams
United States Army Corps of Engineers dams
Dams completed in 1955
Energy infrastructure completed in 1988
Dams on the Boise River
1955 establishments in Idaho